Protean Threat is the twenty-third studio album by American garage rock band Osees, released on September 18, 2020, on Castle Face Records. Following the band's previous album, double LP Face Stabber, frontman John Dwyer has said that he intended for Protean Threat to be much like a punk album, shorter in length and composed primarily of short songs. It is the band's first full-length album to be released under the name Osees.

Background and release
In an apparent response to the COVID-19 pandemic and widespread cancellation of concerts, the band initially previewed the album in a rough form as a single take live rehearsal video that premiered on YouTube in March 2020, albeit with a different track order.

Two tracks performed during the Protean Threat live rehearsal video but ultimately not included on the album were subsequently released elsewhere. “Dark Weald” came out as a limited edition lathe cut vinyl single on August 23, 2020, and was later released digitally. A cover of the Alice Cooper & The Spiders song “Don’t Blow Your Mind” then came out on the band’s Weirdo Hairdo EP, released December 18. 2020.

On December 11, 2020, Osees released Panther Rotate, a remix album featuring experimental reworkings of several tracks from Protean Threat.

Tracks from Protean Threat were also performed as part of Osees' live recording and subsequent album Levitation Sessions, one of two pay-per-view streamed shows the band put on in 2020.

Track listing

Personnel
Credits adapted from AllMusic.

Osees
John Dwyer – guitar, vocals, synthesizers, mellotron, tape effects, percussion, samples, inner sleeve photo 
Tim Hellman – bass
Tomas Dolas – keyboards
Dan Rincon – drums
Paul Quattrone – drums, space drum trigger

Technical personnel
Dylan Marcus McConnell – artwork
Enrique Tena Padilla – engineering, mixing
Mario Ramirez – engineering, mixing
JJ Golden – mastering
Matthew Jones – layout

References

2020 albums
Oh Sees albums
Castle Face Records albums